Post tenebras lux is a Latin phrase translated as Light After Darkness. It appears as Post tenebras spero lucem ("After darkness, I hope for light") in the Vulgate version of Job 17:12.

The phrase came to be adopted as the Calvinist motto, and was subsequently adopted as the motto of the entire Protestant Reformation. It is  used by John Calvin's adopted city of Geneva, Switzerland on their coins.  As a mark of its role in the Calvinist movement, the motto is engraved on the Reformation Wall, in Geneva, and the Huguenot Monument, in Franschhoek, South Africa.

In the form Post tenebras spero lucem, the motto appears in Part II of Cervantes' Don Quixote, and features on the title pages of the first editions of both Parts I and II, published by Juan de la Cuesta in 1605 and 1615 respectively.

Post tenebras lux was formerly the state motto of Chile, before being replaced by the Spanish Por la razón o la fuerza (By reason or by force). 

It is/was the motto of:
 American International College (Springfield, Massachusetts)
 Geneva Academy, K–12 school in Monroe, Louisiana
 The Geneva School (a classical Christian school in Winter Park, Florida)
Smith Preparatory Academy (a K-12 classical Christian school in Altamonte Springs, FL)
 Robert College (an American school in Istanbul, Turkey; one of two school mottos)
 Beyoğlu Anadolu Lisesi (an English high school for girls in Istanbul, Turkey) 
 University Externado of Colombia (university in Bogotá, Colombia)
 University of Geneva
 Europa Ventures in the movie "Europa Report"
 Wolverhampton, translated as Out of darkness cometh light; also E tenebris oritur lux (on the seal of the Mayor, Aldermen and Burgesses of the Borough of Wolverhampton).

References

History of Calvinism
Culture in Geneva
Biblical phrases
History of Geneva
Latin mottos
Protestant Reformation
Vulgate Latin words and phrases

it:Post Tenebras Lux